The 371st Bombardment Squadron is an inactive United States Air Force unit.  Its last assignment was with the 307th Bombardment Wing, based at Lincoln AFB, Nebraska.  It was inactivated on 25 March 1965.

History
Formed as a heavy bombardment group in January 1942, trained in the Pacific Northwest under Second Air Force, with B-17 Flying Fortresses.   Reassigned to Seventh Air Force in Hawaii, November 1942 and performed performing search and rescue and antisubmarine patrols until January 1943 while transitioning to long-range B-24 Liberator heavy bombers.

Deployed to Central Pacific from Hawaii throughout 1943 for long-range combat bombardment operations against Japanese forces in the Central Pacific; New Guinea; Northern Solomon Islands and Eastern Mandates campaigns.  Deployed to the New Hebrides in Melanesia and operated from numerous temporary jungle airfields, engaging in long-range bombardment operations during the Bismarck Archipelago; Western Pacific; Leyte; Luzon and Southern Philippines campaigns until the end of the war in August 1945.   Assigned to Clark Field, Philippines after the war ended, demobilized with personnel returning to the United States, unit inactivated as paper unit in January 1946 in California.

Reactivated as B-29 Superfortress squadron at MacDill Field, Florida in August 1946 as part of Strategic Air Command.  Was a training unit for antisubmarine warfare.  Deployed to Okinawa during Korean War, carrying out combat operations over Korea throughout the conflict.  Remained in Okinawa until November 1954 when inactivated.  Reactivated simultaneously at Lincoln AFB, Nebraska, as a B-47 Stratojet medium jet bomber squadron, performed REFLEX deployments to North Africa until phaseout of B-47 in 1965 and inactivated.

Lineage
 Constituted as the 371st Bombardment Squadron (Heavy) on 28 January 1942
 Activated on 15 April 1942
 Redesignated 371st Bombardment Squadron, Heavy c. March 1944
 Inactivated on 18 January 1946
 Redesignated 371st Bombardment Squadron, Very Heavy on 15 July 1946
 Activated on 4 August 1946
 Redesignated 371st Bombardment Squadron, Medium on 28 May 1948
 Inactivated on 25 March 1965

Assignments
 307th Bombardment Group, 15 April 1942 – 18 January 1946
 307th Bombardment Group, 4 August 1946 (attached to 307th Bombardment Wing after 14 February 1951)
 307th Bombardment Wing, 16 June 1952 – 25 March 1965

Stations

 Geiger Field, Washington, 15 April 1942
 Ephrata Army Air Base, Washington, 28 May 1942
 Sioux City Army Air Base, Iowa, 30 September-20 October 1942
 Wheeler Field, Hawaii, 2 November 1942 (operated from: Henderson Field, Midway Atoll, 21–24 December 1942 and 20–25 January 1943; Canton Island Airfield, Phoenix Islands, 6–12 February 1943: Funafuti Airfield, Nanumea, Gilbert Islands, 18–23 April 1943 and 27 July-1 August 1943
 Luganville Airfield, Espiritu Santo, New Hebrides, 13 June 1943 9operated from: Henderson Field, Guadalcanal, 25 August-14 October 1943; 24 November-31 December 19430

 Munda Airfield, New Georgia, Solomon Islands, 9 January 1944
 Momote Airfield, Los Negros, Admiralty Islands, 13 May 1944
 Wakde Airfield, Netherlands East Indies, 22 August 1944 9operated from: Kornasoren (Yebrurro) Airfield, Noemfoor, Schouten Islands, c. 18 September-c. 20 November 19440
 Wama Airfield, Morotai, Netherlands East Indies, 10 November 1944
 Clark Field, Luzon, Philippines, 1 September-27 December 1945
 Camp Stoneman, California, 16–18 January 1946
 MacDill Field (later macDill Air Force Base), Florida, 4 August 1946 (operated from Kadena Air Base, Okinawa after c. 5 August 1950
 Kadena Air Base, Okinawa, 15 August 1953
 Lincoln Air Force Base, Nebraska, 19 November 1954 – 25 March 1965

Aircraft
 Boeing B-17 Flying Fortress, 1942
 Consolidated B-24 Liberator, 1942–1945
 Boeing B-29 Superfortress, 1946–1954
 Boeing B-47 Stratojet, 1955–1965

References

Notes
 Explanatory notes

 Citations

Bibliography

 
 
 

Military units and formations established in 1942
Bombardment squadrons of the United States Air Force
Bombardment squadrons of the United States Army Air Forces
United States Air Force units and formations in the Korean War